María Isabel Ana Mantecón Vernalte (born 11 May 1953), better known as Kiti Mánver, is a Spanish actress. She has appeared in more than 100 films and television shows since 1970.

Biography 
María Isabel Ana Mantecón Vernalte  was born in Antequera on 11 May 1953. She spent her early childhood in between Málaga and Melilla, moving to Madrid at age 13. She then featured in the 1973 film Habla, mudita.

In 2015, she came to the London stage to play the lead role in Las heridas del viento, a play by Juan Carlos Rubio, as part of the 3rd Festival of Spanish Theatre in London (Festelón).

Selected filmography
 Habla, mudita (1973)
 Yankee Dudler (1973)
 Luna de lobos (1987)
 Women on the Verge of a Nervous Breakdown (1988)
 Anything for Bread (1991)
 The Flower of My Secret (1995)
 Things I Left in Havana (1997)
 Don Quixote, Knight Errant (2002)
 Take My Eyes (2003)
 The End of a Mystery (2003)
 Sunday Light (2007)
 Gran Hotel (2011)
 Cable Girls (2017)
 Money Heist (2017)
 One Careful Owner (2020)
 Mamacruz (2023)

Accolades

References

External links

1953 births
Living people
Actresses from Andalusia
People from Antequera
Spanish film actresses
Chicas Almodóvar
20th-century Spanish actresses
21st-century Spanish actresses
Spanish television actresses
Spanish stage actresses